Kentenia may refer to:

Kentenia, Kentucky, a community in Harlan County, Kentucky
Kentenia State Forest, a state forest in Harlan County, Kentucky